Pointu is a French surname. Notable people with this surname include:

 Germaine Pointu (1900–1943), married name Germaine Cernay, French mezzo-soprano
 Jeannette Pointu, Belgian comic book character
 Monsieur Pointu (1922–2006), Canadian violinist

See also
 Matadeen v Pointu, Supreme Court of Mauritius case